Rodrigo Tavares (26 December 1978) is a Portuguese-born academic, finance professional, and public administrator. Previously, he was Head of Foreign Affairs of the São Paulo state government.

Biography
He received his Ph.D. in Peace and Development Studies in 2006 from the University of Gothenburg and conducted his postdoctoral research at Columbia University's Institute of Latin American Studies.  He then was a research fellow at the United Nations University in Belgium and Ethiopia, and a senior research fellow at Harvard University.

From 2011 to 2014, he served as the Head of the Office of Foreign Affairs of the São Paulo state government, under Geraldo Alckmin.

In 2015, he founded and became president of the Granito Group, a company that aims to support the field of sustainable capitalism though consulting, investment banking, and policy & research.

In 2017 he was named as a Young Global Leader by the World Economic Forum.

In 2018 he was nominated StartUp Portugal Ambassador, the agency tasked to promote globally the Portuguese innovation ecosystem, together with Vhils, Maria Mota and Miguel Pina Martins.

He is an op-ed columnist for Folha de São Paulo, where he writes on finance, economics, and sustainability, and for TSF where he writes about his native Portugal.

Publications

Academic papers

Books

References

Living people
Portuguese academics
University of Gothenburg alumni
Year of birth missing (living people)